Addo is a (Ghanaian) surname. Notable people with the (Asante, Ga and Akuapim dialect) surname include:

 Aaron Addo Dankwah (born 1993), Ghanaian footballer
 Adeline Akufo-Addo (1917-2004), Nana Akufo-Addo's mother
 Addoquaye Addo (born 1985), Ghanaian footballer
 Akosua Obuo Addo (born 1962), Ghanaian Jamaican music educator
 Charles Addo Odametey (1937–2006), Ghanaian footballer
 Daniel Addo (born 1976), Ghanaian footballer
 Daniel Addo (born 1987), Ghanaian footballer
 Daniel Addo, Ghanaian soldier and politician
 Daniel Ashley Addo (born 1989), Ghanaian footballer
 David Addo (born 1983), Ghanaian footballer
 D. K. Addo, Ghanaian military personnel
 Ebenezer Kwadwo Teye Addo, Ghanaian politician 
 Edmund Addo (born 2000), Ghanaian football player
 Edward Akufo-Addo (1906–1979), lawyer, former president of Ghana
 Elijah Amoo Addo (born 1990), Ghanaian chef
 Elizabeth Addo (born 1993), Ghanaian footballer
 Emmanuel Nii Akwei Addo (born 1943), Ghanaian lawyer
 Eric Addo (born 1978), Ghanaian footballer
 Farah Weheliye Addo (born 1935 or 1940–2008), Somali sports administrator
 Felix E. Addo (born 1955), Ghanaian executive 
 Frimpong Yaw Addo (born 1962), Ghanaian politician
 G. Bedu-Addo, Ghanaian military personnel 
 Grace Addo (born 1960), Ghanaian politician
 Herbert Addo (1951–2017), Ghanaian association football manager
 Irene Naa Torshie Addo (born 1970), Ghanaian politician 
 Ishmael Addo (born 1982), Ghanaian footballer
 Joan Anim-Addo, Grenadian poet 
 Joe Addo (born 1971), Ghanaian footballer
 Joseph Addo (born 1990), Ghanaian footballer
 Josephine Hilda Addo, Ghanaian politician
 Joyce Bamford-Addo (born 1937), Ghanaian judge and politician
 J. S. Addo, Ghanaian economist 
 Julius Sarkodee-Addo (1908–1972), Ghanaian judge
 Kwaku Sakyi-Addo, Ghanaian journalist
 Kwame Addo-Kufuor (born 1940), Ghanaian politician and physician
 Kwasi Alfred Addo Kwarteng (born 1975), British politician
 Marylyn Addo (born 1970), German virologist
 Mercy Bampo Addo, Ghanaian diplomat
 Nana Akua Addo, Ghanaian model
 Nana Akufo-Addo (born 1944), Ghanaian lawyer and politician
 Otto Addo (born 1975), Ghanaian-German footballer
 Paul Addo (born 1990), Ghanaian footballer
 Michael Ansgar Addo, Founder of H2oaqua Solutions Ltd
 Ransford Addo (born 1983), Ghanaian footballer
 Rebecca Akufo-Addo (born 1951), Ghanaian public figure
 Simon Addo (born 1974), Ghanaian footballer

References 

Surnames of Ashanti origin
Surnames of Akan origin
Ghanaian surnames
Surnames of Ga origin